Francine Dee Blau (born August 29, 1946 in New York City) is an American economist and professor of economics as well as Industrial and Labor Relations at Cornell University. In 2010, Blau was the first woman to receive the IZA Prize in Labor Economics for her "seminal contributions to the economic analysis of labor market inequality." She was awarded the 2017 Jacob Mincer Award by the Society of Labor Economists in recognition of lifetime of contributions to the field of labor economics.

Personal life and education
Blau was born to parents Harold Raymond Blau and Sylvia Blau, née Goldberg, in New York City. Her parents divorced when she was six years old. She and her brother lived with their mother until Sylvia Blau became ill. After that, the children went to live with their father. Harold Blau supported Francine's wish to become an economist.

Blau graduated from Forest Hills High School in Queens in 1963, after which she entered Cornell University and received her B.S. in industrial and labor relations in 1966. She received her M.A. in economics from Harvard University in 1969 and her Ph.D. in economics from the same university in 1975.

Blau is married to Lawrence M. Kahn, also an economics professor at Cornell University. Together they have two children.

Career
Blau is currently the Frances Perkins Professor of Industrial and Labor Relations and Professor of Economics at Cornell University. Before coming to Cornell in 1994, she was an assistant, associate, and professor of Economics and Labor and Industrial Relations at the University of Illinois at Urbana-Champaign where she joined the faculty in 1975. Prior to that, she was a research associate at Ohio State University and a visiting lecturer at Yale University.<ref name="blaug">Blaug, Mark and Howard R. Vane. Who's who in economics'.] Cheltenham, UK, Northampton, MA: Edward Elgar Pub., 2003, .</ref>

Blau is a research associate at the National Bureau of Economic Research, a research fellow at the Institute for the Study of Labor (IZA), and a research fellow at the Center for Economic Studies. She is a fellow of the Society of Labor Economists, the American Academy of Political and Social Science, and the Labor and Employment Relations Association. She is also a fellow at the Center for the Study of Poverty and Inequality (Stanford University) and a research fellow at the Compensation Research Initiative (Cornell University).

She has served as vice president of the American Economic Association, president of the Society of Labor Economists, the Labor and Employment Relations Association, and the Midwest Economics Association. She is an Associate Editor of Labour Economics and was formerly an editor of the Journal of Labor Economics and an Associate Editor of the Journal of Economic Perspectives. She serves or has served on numerous Editorial Boards, including the American Economic Review, the Journal of Labor Economics, the Journal of Economic Perspectives, the ILR Review, the Journal of Labor Research, and The Annals of the American Academy of Political and Social Science, among others.

Awards

 2001 The Carolyn Shaw Bell Award, awarded by the American Economic Association Committee on the Status of Women in the Economics Profession for furthering the status of women in the economics profession.
 2002 Richard A. Lester Prize for the outstanding book in labor economics and industrial relations for At Home and Abroad: U.S. Labor Market Performance in International Perspective (with Lawrence Kahn).
 2003 Fellow (Founding Fellow), Society of Labor Economists.
 2005 Eleanor Roosevelt Fellow, American Academy of Political and Social Science.
 2009 Academic Fellow (Inaugural Fellow), Labor and Employment Relations Association.
 2010 IZA Prize in Labor Economics
 2017 Jacob Mincer Award for Lifetime Contributions to the Field of Labor Economics by the Society of Labor Economists (SOLE).
 2017 Judge William B. Groat Alumni Award, ILR School, Cornell University.
 2018 Distinguished Fellow Award, American Economic Association.

Selected publications

Books
 Blau, Francine D. (1977). Equal Pay in the Office. Lexington, Mass: Lexington Books. .
 Blau, Francine D.; Ehrenberg, Ronald G. (eds.) (1997). [https://www.russellsage.org/publications/gender-and-family-issues-workplace-0 Gender and Family Issues in the Workplace. New York: Russell Sage Foundation. .
 Blau, Francine D.; Kahn, Lawrence M. (2002). At Home and Abroad: U.S. Labor Market Performance in International Perspective. New York: Russell Sage Foundation. .
 Eds. Blau, Francine D.; Brinton, Mary C.; Grusky, David B. (2006). The Declining Significance of Gender? New York: Russell Sage Foundation. .
 Blau, Francine D.; Eds. Anne C. Gielen, and Klaus F. Zimmermann (2012). Gender, Inequality, and Wages. Oxford University Press. .
 Eds. Blau, Francine D. and Christopher Mackie (2017). The Economic and Fiscal Consequences of Immigration. Washington, DC: The National Academies Press. .
 
 Blau, Francine D.; Ferber, Marianne A. The Economics of Women, Men, and Work.  Englewood Cliffs, NJ: Prentice-Hall, 1st ed. 1986, 2nd ed. 1992.
 Blau, Francine D.; Ferber, Marianne A.; Winkler, Anne E. The Economics of Women, Men, and Work''. Upper Saddle River, NJ: Prentice-Hall, 3rd ed. 1998, 4th ed. 2002, 5th ed. 2006, 6th ed. 2010, 7th ed. 2014.

References

External links 
 Curriculum Vitae Francine D. Blau at National Bureau of Economic Research
 "Francine D. Blau" at Cornell University
 

1946 births
Economists from New York (state)
American women economists
Cornell University School of Industrial and Labor Relations alumni
Cornell University School of Industrial and Labor Relations faculty
Harvard Graduate School of Arts and Sciences alumni
Labor economists
Living people
Scientists from New York City
21st-century American economists
Forest Hills High School (New York) alumni
21st-century American women